( is an old and famous Irish male name meaning "lover of canines". It is the source of the Irish names Conor, Connor, Connors, Conner, O'Connor, etc. It is a name borne by several figures from Irish history and legend, including:

 Conchobar mac Nessa, legendary king of Ulster
 Conchobar Abradruad, legendary High King of Ireland of the 1st century BC
 Conchobar mac Donnchada, High King of Ireland 819–833
 Conchobar Maenmaige Ua Conchobair, 12th-century king of Connacht
 Conchobar MacDermot, king of Moylurg 1187–1196
 Conchobur Mac Cathmhail (died 1252) royal chief of Cenel Feradhaigh and of many territories besides
 Conchobar mac Tadg, king of Connacht 967–973 and eponym of the O'Conor family
 Conchobar 'Buidhe' Mág Tighearnán (anglicised Conor 'The Tawny' McKiernan) was chief of the McKiernan Clan of Tullyhunco, County Cavan from 1312 until 1314

See also
List of Irish-language given names

References

Irish-language masculine given names